Patricia Conolly (born 29 August 1933) is an Australian stage actress.

Biography
Conolly began her stage career in Australia where she grew up, and has performed in England in the West End, the Royal Shakespeare Company, and Chichester Festival Theatre (Laurence Olivier's company); in Canada for the Stratford Shakespeare Festival; and on Broadway, Off-Broadway and in US regional theaters, including Guthrie Theater, Hartford Stage Company, Old Globe Theatre, Arena Stage, and Seattle Repertory Theatre.

On Broadway her credits include To Kill A Mockingbird, The Front Page, Is He Dead?, Enchanted April, Judgment at Nuremberg, Waiting in the Wings, Hedda Gabler (Roundabout Theatre Company) The Sound of Music, The Heiress, A Small Family Business, The Circle, Blithe Spirit, and roles at the Lyceum with the APA/Repertory Company, under the direction of Ellis Rabb. At Lincoln Center for the Performing Arts she has appeared in Tom Stoppard's The Coast of Utopia directed by Jack O'Brien, and earlier in A Streetcar Named Desire with Rosemary Harris, (director Ellis Rabb). Off Broadway her credits include House and Garden, Woman in Mind (Manhattan Theatre Club), Tartuffe, Born Again, The Importance of Being Earnest (Circle in the Square Theatre), The Real Inspector Hound, Gabriel at the Atlantic Theater Company, Beyond the Horizon at the Irish Repertory Theatre, Rasheeda Speaking  at the New Group, and most recently, The Belle of Belfast  at the Irish Repertory Theatre.

She has performed in major classical roles, (they include Viola, Isabella, Rosalind, Regan, Phaedra, Jocasta, Mrs.Alving, Nora, Blanche Dubois, Amanda Wingfield and others), and has directed and taught at several theater training programs, including the Old Globe Theatre/University of San Diego MFA program, University of North Carolina School of the Arts, Juilliard School, Florida Atlantic University, University of Southern California, and Boston University.  Patricia Conolly is the widow of actor, Dan Bly (d. 1973), the mother of Emily Bly, and is married to actor, Colin McPhillamy.

References

External links

1933 births
Australian stage actresses
Audiobook narrators
Living people